Choerodonicola is a genus of trematodes in the family Opecoelidae.

Species
Choerodonicola calotomi (Yamaguti, 1934) [emend. Yamaguti, 1938] Cribb, 2005
Choerodonicola choerodontis (Yamaguti, 1934) [emend. Yamguti, 1938 [emend. Kuramochi, 2006]] Cribb, 2005
Choerodonicola pacificus (Yamaguti, 1938) Cribb, 2005
Choerodonicola renko Machida, 2014

References

Opecoelidae
Plagiorchiida genera